James Wynn House, also known as the Peery House, is a historic home located near Tazewell, Tazewell County, Virginia. It was built about 1828, and is a large two-story, three-bay, brick dwelling with a two-story rear ell.  The main block has a gable roof and exterior end chimneys.  Across the front facade is a one-story, hip-roofed porch.

It was listed on the National Register of Historic Places in 1992.

References

Houses on the National Register of Historic Places in Virginia
Houses completed in 1828
Houses in Tazewell County, Virginia
National Register of Historic Places in Tazewell County, Virginia